Dalheim is a commune and town in south-eastern Luxembourg. It is part of the canton of Remich, which is part of the district of Grevenmacher.

, the town of Dalheim, which lies in the centre of the commune, has a population of 1,232.  Other towns within the commune include Filsdorf and Welfrange.

Church 

The church in Dalheim, built in 1743, is a Catholic church dedicated to Saints Peter and Paul.  It is situated on the "Péiteschbierg" high above the village center. It is particularly distinguished by its unique frescoes from the second half of the 18th century (painted by the Luxembourgish artist Johann Georg Weiser) and statues of the two patron saints situated outside the church.  However, in 2017, the statue of St Paul was decapitated and the head placed outside the front door of the presbytery.  There has been press speculation that this incident occurred in order to intimidate the resident priest, Fr Jean-Marie Belanga.  Both statues were removed shortly after the incident by the local administration for repairs.  Fr Belanga, who had previously been stopped from preaching by the Archdiocese due to complaints about the conservative and Catholic nature of his homilies, was also subsequently removed from his position as parish priest in the village and told to leave Luxembourg.  Fr Belanga was the first priest of African origin to serve as the parish priest of Dalheim.

Roman Settlement 
To the south of today's village of Dalheim, is evidence of a Roman settlement named Ricciacum, located on the highest point of a gentle slope facing south-west.

Ricciacum had impressive public buildings (theatre, thermal baths and temple), which gave it the attributes of a small Roman town. Some of these monuments can still be visited today.

Population

Gallery

References

External links

  Commune of Dalheim official website
  Dalheim-Online: the towns of Dalheim, Welfrange and Filsdorf
  Webpage of Firefighters of Dalheim and Welfrange

 
Communes in Remich (canton)
Towns in Luxembourg
Archaeology of Luxembourg